, or JTA, is an airline based in Naha, Okinawa Prefecture, Japan. It operates domestic services on behalf of Japan Airlines. Its main base is Naha Airport.  From 1967 until 1993, the airline was known as Southwest Air Lines.

History 

It changed its name in July 1993. It has 718 employees (at March 2014) and is owned by Japan Airlines (51.1%), Naha Airport Terminal (17%), Okinawa Prefecture (12.9%) and others (19.1%) It flew Convair 240s until new capital from JAL allowed it to upgrade to NAMC YS-11s, and eventually Boeing 737s. JTA occasionally lends aircraft to JAL in the event of equipment failure. JTA also provides maintenance services for JAL Group Boeing 737-400 aircraft. JTA owns 72.9% of Ryukyu Air Commuter. At one time the head office of Southwest Air Lines was at 306-1 Kagamizu in Naha.

Destinations 
JTA serves the following destinations:

Fleet

Current fleet

The Japan Transocean Air fleet consists of the following aircraft (as of February 2019):

Former fleet
Boeing 737-200
Boeing 737-400
Boeing 767-200
NAMC YS-11

Accidents and incidents
Since the airline's foundation, there has only been one accident which was under the former Southwest Air Lines brand.

 On 26 August 1982, Southwest Air Lines Flight 611, a Boeing 737-2Q3, registration JA8444, overran the runway at Ishigaki Airport and was destroyed. None of the 138 passengers and crew were killed but some were injured during the emergency evacuation.

References

External links

 

 
Regional airlines of Japan
Japan Airlines
Oneworld affiliate members
Airlines established in 1967
Transport in Okinawa Prefecture
1967 establishments in Okinawa
Japanese companies established in 1967